The England cricket team toured Pakistan in September and October 2022 to play seven Twenty20 International (T20I) matches as a preparatory series before the 2022 ICC Men's T20 World Cup. The English team returned to Pakistan in December 2022 to play three Test matches. The Test matches formed part of the 2021–2023 ICC World Test Championship.

In November 2021, Tom Harrison, the Chief Executive of the England and Wales Cricket Board (ECB), flew to Pakistan to repair the relationship between the ECB and the Pakistan Cricket Board (PCB) after England's planned tour to Pakistan in October 2021 was cancelled. After positive talks, the original tour itinerary of five T20I matches was increased to seven. The T20Is were  scheduled to be played first, with the Test matches taking place following the 2022 ICC Men's T20 World Cup in Australia. In April 2022, the Pakistan Cricket Board (PCB) confirmed that the series would be taking place. In July 2022, the PCB's Chairman Ramiz Raja said that the T20I matches would be likely to take place in Lahore and Karachi. The details of the T20I series was confirmed on 2 August 2022. The itinerary for the Test series was later announced on 22 August 2022.

A total of 189,595 spectators watched the T20I leg of the series, at a 97.35% crowd attendance, making it the highest-attended series in Pakistan cricket history.

On 16 December 2022, Pakistan's Azhar Ali announced that he would retire from Test cricket following the completion of the Test series.

England won the Test series 3–0, to become the first team to claim a clean sweep in a three-match series in Pakistan. This was also only the fourth time that England had taken a clean sweep in any away series of three Tests or more.

Squads

The ECB announced that Jos Buttler would miss the opening matches of the T20I series due to a calf injury, with Moeen Ali standing in as captain. Alex Hales was later added to the T20I squad. On 30 September, Pakistan's Naseem Shah was ruled out of the remainder of the T20I series due to COVID-19 positive result, with playing the first match only.

Rehan Ahmed was added to England's Test squad on 23 November. England's Liam Livingstone was ruled out of last two tests after sustaining a right knee injury during the first Test. On 5 December, Pakistan's Haris Rauf was ruled out of the remainder of the Test series, having sustained a quad injury in the first Test.

Warm-up match
Before the Test series, England played a three-day warm-up match against England Lions in Abu Dhabi.

T20I series

1st T20I

2nd T20I

3rd T20I

4th T20I

5th T20I

6th T20I

7th T20I

Test series

1st Test

2nd Test

3rd Test

Notes

References

External links
 Series home at ESPNcricinfo (T20Is)
 Series home at ESPNcricinfo (Tests)

2022 in English cricket
2022 in Pakistani cricket
International cricket competitions in 2022–23
English cricket tours of Pakistan